Indian Journal may refer to

 Indian Journal, a newspaper published in Eufaula, Oklahoma
 Indian Journal of Anaesthesia
 Indian Journal of Cancer
 Indian Journal of Community Medicine
 Indian Journal of Critical Care Medicine
 Indian Journal of Dental Research
 Indian Journal of Dermatology, Venereology and Leprology
 Indian Journal of Dermatology
 Indian Journal of Human Genetics
 Indian Journal of Law and Technology
 Indian Journal of Medical and Paediatric Oncology
 Indian Journal of Medical Sciences
 Indian Journal of Occupational and Environmental Medicine
 Indian Journal of Ophthalmology
 Indian Journal of Palliative Care
 Indian Journal of Pharmaceutical Sciences
 Indian Journal of Pharmacology
 Indian Journal of Plastic Surgery
 Indian Journal of Psychological Medicine
 Indian Journal of Radiology and Imaging
 Indian Journal of Sexually Transmitted Diseases and AIDS
 Indian Journal of Urology